Sami Gafsi (born 18 March 1980) is a Tunisian football manager.

References

1980 births
Living people
Tunisian football managers
AS Gabès managers
Club Athlétique Bizertin managers